The 1961–62 Segunda División season was the 31st since its establishment and was played between 3 September 1961 and 1 April 1962.

Overview before the season
32 teams joined the league, including two relegated from the 1960–61 La Liga and 7 promoted from the 1960–61 Tercera División.

Relegated from La Liga
Valladolid
Granada

Promoted from Tercera División

Alavés
Atlético Baleares
Albacete
Recreativo
Cartagena
Burgos
Villarrobledo

Group North

Teams

League table

Top goalscorers

Top goalkeepers

Results

Group South

Teams

League table

Top goalscorers

Top goalkeepers

Results

Promotion playoffs

First leg

Second leg

Relegation playoffs

First leg

Second leg

Tiebreaker

External links
BDFútbol

Segunda División seasons
2
Spain